Angelo Marcuzzi (died 1453) was a Roman Catholic prelate who served as Bishop of Telese (1413–1453).

Biography
On 20 January 1413, Angelo Marcuzzi was appointed during the papacy of Pope Gregory XII as Bishop of Telese.
On 5 March 1413, he was consecrated bishop by Benedetto de Pradosso, Bishop of Capri, with Angelo de Consilio, Bishop of Acerra, Grimaldo Turculis, Bishop of Giovinazzo, and Pietro de Gattula, Bishop of Sant'Agata de' Goti, serving as co-consecrators. 
He served as Bishop of Telese until his death in 1453.

See also 
Catholic Church in Italy

References

External links and additional sources
 (Chronology of Bishops) 
 (Chronology of Bishops) 

Year of birth missing
1453 deaths
15th-century Italian Roman Catholic bishops
Bishops appointed by Pope Gregory XII